Single-leaf may refer to:

 Single-leaf ash, a deciduous tree
 Single Leaf Bat, a mammal
 Single leaf bridge, a movable truss bridge with an elevated counterweight
 Single-leaf door, a door which consists of a single rigid panel that fills a doorway
 Single-leaf Pinyon, an evergreen tree
 Single-leaf woodcut, an individual woodcut print